Herbert Stuart may refer to:

 Herbert Arthur Stuart (1899–1974), German experimental physicist 
 Herbert Akroyd Stuart (1864–1927), English inventor
 Herbert Stuart (priest) (1924–2019), Anglican priest